The 1910 Minnesota gubernatorial election took place on November 8, 1910. Republican Party of Minnesota candidate Adolph Olson Eberhart defeated Democratic Party of Minnesota challenger James Gray.

Results

See also
 List of Minnesota gubernatorial elections

External links
 http://www.sos.state.mn.us/home/index.asp?page=653
 http://www.sos.state.mn.us/home/index.asp?page=657

Minnesota
Gubernatorial
1910
November 1910 events